Musica Viva was founded in 1945 by Romanian-born violinist Richard Goldner, with the aim of bringing chamber music to Australia. The co-founder was a German-born musicologist, Walter Dullo. At its inception, Musica Viva was a string ensemble performing chamber music to small groups of European immigrants. By 2013, Musica Viva had become one of the largest chamber music presenters in the world.

Musica Viva runs a large music education programs across Australia, called Musica Viva In Schools.

The CEO is Hywel Sims. The Artistic Director is conductor and author Paul Kildea.

History 
Musica Viva's heritage arose from the vision of Richard Goldner, a Romanian-born violist who had trained in Vienna. Goldner arrived in Australia as a refugee in 1939 but maintained his strong connections with many of the most respected musicians in Europe.

Once asked what he expected when he arrived in Australia, his answer was simple. First he expected to save his life. Second, he soon realised that music was not a way of life in Australia in the way it was in Europe. Men generally did not attend concerts as it was considered 'sissy' – a perception that lasted until the GIs came from America.

Goldner persevered and soon after formed the Monomeeth String Quartet, which took its name from an Aboriginal Australian word for peace and harmony.

Inspired by his life in Vienna and respect for his teacher Simon Pullman, Goldner was determined to create a "Pullman-like" ensemble in Sydney. Reading in 1944 of his mentor's death in the Treblinka extermination camp in August 1942, he accelerated his plans, recruiting 17 musicians and divided them into four string quartets (and piano). The quartets were trained individually before uniting as one group, named Richard Goldner's Sydney Musica Viva. In this enterprise, he was assisted by fellow immigrant Walter Dullo, who is usually credited as Musica Viva's co-founder.

The first concert of Sydney Musica Viva was presented at Verbrugghen Hall, Sydney Conservatorium of Music on 8 December 1945. Let down by Sydney's unreliable post-war power supply, the concert took place in darkness save the headlights of several cars parked in the doorway of the auditorium and some hurricane lamps in the foyers.  The program included Beethoven's Große Fuge and Dullo's string orchestra arrangement of a work for mechanical organ by Mozart.

International Concert Season
Musica Viva's International Concert Season presents  chamber musicians from around the world.

 Concerts are held in: Adelaide; Brisbane; Canberra; Melbourne; Sydney; Newcastle; and Perth.
 The 2020 season featured Garrick Ohlsson, Goldner String Quartet, Piers Lane, Cho-liang Lin, Jon Kimura Parker, Chanticleer (ensemble), Eggner Trio, Diana Doherty, Les Talens Lyriques, Siobhan Stagg and Goldmund Quartet.
 The 2019 season featured Natalie Clein, ZOFO, Doric Quartet, Emerson String Quartet, Choir of King's College, Cambridge, Nevermind and Skride Quartet.
 The 2018 Season featured Sabine Meyer, Alliage Quintett, Avi Avital, Giocoso String Quartet, Joyce Yang, Ray Chen, Tafelmusik Baroque Orchestra, Borodin Quartet, Benedetti Elschenbroich Grynyuk Trio, comprising Nicola Benedetti, Leonard Elschenbroich and Alexei Grynyuk, plus special gala recitals by pianist Sir András Schiff.
 The 2017 Season featured Orchestra of the Age of Enlightenment with violinist Rachel Podger, Eighth Blackbird, Pacifica Quartet, Sitkovetsky Trio, Takács Quartet, Angela Hewitt, and piano-cello duo Nicolas Altstaedt and Aleksandar Madžar.
 The 2016 Season featured Stephen Hough, Choir of Trinity College Cambridge, Trio Dali, violin-piano duo Ben Beilman and Andrew Tyson, Jerusalem Quartet, Enso String Quartet and a semi-staged chamber opera 'Voyage to the Moon' in collaboration with Victorian Opera.
 The 2015 Season featured Tafelmusik, the Eggner Trio, the Modigliani Quartet, the Goldner String Quartet, Steven Isserlis with Connie Shih, I Fagiolini, Paul Lewis, and Maxim Vengerov.  
 The 2014 Season featured the Kelemen Quartet, the Sitkovetsky Trio, the American Brass Quintet, the Choir of King's College, Cambridge, Imogen Cooper, the Borodin Quartet, and Ray Chen with Timothy Young.
 The 2013 Season featured Karin Schaupp and Pavel Steidl, the Morgenstern Trio and Christopher Moore, the Tokyo String Quartet, Jian Wang and Bernadette Harvey, the Elias String Quartet, Angela Hewitt, and the Academy of Ancient Music and Sara Macliver. The featured composers for 2013 are Peter Sculthorpe, Ross Edwards, Carl Vine and Matthew Hindson.
 The 2012 Season featured Tafelmusik, Diana Doherty with the St. Lawrence String Quartet, Trio Dali, the Takács Quartet, Amarcord, the Kuss Quartet, Naoko Shimizu, Anthony Marwood and Aleksandar Madžar. Gordon Kerry was the featured composer.
 The 2011 series featured: Andreas Scholl, the Eggner Trio, the Brentano String Quartet, Concerto Copenhagen with Genevieve Lacey, the Goldner String Quartet with Ian Munro, Stephen Hough, and Sabine Meyer with the Modigliani Quartet. Ian Munro was the 2011 Featured Composer.

Musica Viva in Schools
Since 1981 Musica Viva In Schools has been inspiring children to think about, actively listen to, and create music by bringing professional live music performances to primary and secondary schools all over Australia. Musica Viva In Schools provide teachers with up-to-date training and the latest digital technology so they can incorporate the live music experience into their everyday classroom teaching.

The Musician in the Classroom residency program sends professional musicians and composers to work directly with students. This could be to teach a school band, to coach a choir, to help write a school song, or just to teach music in the classroom.

Through grants and special funding, Musica Viva also creates special music projects for remote, disadvantaged and special needs schools and their students.  The major program for secondary students, Live Music Packages, is a live performance and a workshop.

In 2014, The Guardian named Musica Viva in Schools' Interactive Whiteboard as one of the ten global R&D projects that were changing arts and culture.

In 2016 Musica Viva announced the inaugural Artistic Director of Education, Michael Sollis.

Musica Viva Festival
The Musica Viva Festival is held biennially at the Sydney Conservatorium of Music. The festival is a four-day celebration of chamber music featuring the best international and local artists on stage. During the festival mentorship is provided for the Australian Youth Orchestra Chamber Players.

 In 2019, the Festival featured Edgar Meyer, Dover Quartet, Goldner String Quartet, Tessa Lark, Andrew Tyson, Adam Walker, Aura Go, Konstantin Shamray and Timo-Veikko Valve.
 In 2017, the Festival featured Pinchas Zukerman, Lambert Orkis, Amy Dickson, Elias Quartet, Goldner String Quartet, Amir Farid and Arcadia Winds.
 In 2015, the Festival featured Mischa Maisky, Pavel Haas Quartet, Aleksandar Madžar, Nicolas Altstaedt, Doric String Quartet, Karin Schaupp, Orava Quartet and Bella Hristova.
 In 2013, the Musica Viva Festival included Lambert Orkis, Benjamin Beilman, Alice Giles, Sharon Bezaly, Hector McDonald, Pieter Wispelwey, Pacifica Quartet, and Goldner String Quartet.
 In 2011 the second Musica Viva Festival was held in Sydney; musicians included Pekka Kuusisto, Takács Quartet, Eggner Trio, Khatia Buniatishvili and Goldner String Quartet.

Coffee Concerts
Musica Viva’s Coffee Concerts are held in Sydney and Melbourne on five Tuesday/Wednesday mornings throughout the year. Here friends meet for cake and coffee in the foyer, then enjoy a short one-hour concert from a diverse selection of Australia’s finest chamber ensembles and soloists. The Sydney venue is the Independent Theatre until 2019 when it will move to The Concourse, Chatswood. The Melbourne venue is the Elisabeth Murdoch Hall and from 2019 will be renamed Melbourne Morning Masters.
 The 2019 season featured Goldner String Quartet, Sydney Chamber Choir, Accademia Arcadia, Alice Giles and Aura Go.
 The 2018 season featured Karin Schaupp & Umberto Clerici, Australian Brass Quintet, winner of the 2017 Michael Hill International Violin Competition, Ioana Cristina Goicea together with the winner of the 2016 Sydney International Piano Competition, Andrey Gugnin, Ensemble Liaison, Latitude 37, Goldner String Quartet and the Grand Prize winner of the 2018 Melbourne International Chamber Music Competition, Trio Marvin.
 The 2017 season features Arcadia Winds, Goldner String Quartet, Piers Lane, Umberto Clerici, The Consort of Melbourne, Streeton Trio, Emma Black, Caroline Almonte, Alexandre Da Costa and Kristian Chong.
 The 2016 season featured Tinalley String Quartet, Benaud Trio and Goldner String Quartet
 The 2014 Sydney season featured  Young Kwon Choi, the Piano Trio from Australia Ensemble @UNSW, Catrin Finch, the Brisbane Chamber Choir, and the Goldner String Quartet.
 The 2014 Melbourne season featured Young Kwon Choi, Songmakers Australia, Nikki Chooii & Amid Farid, James Crabb & Genevieve Lacey, and the Goldner String Quartet.
 The 2013 Sydney season featured Karak, Lissa Moore, Enigma Quartet, Emma Sholl & Clemens Leske, and The Choir of Trinity College, Melbourne.
 The 2013 Melbourne season featured Seven Harp Ensemble, Wilma & Friends, Li-Wei Qin & Kristian Chong, The Choir of Trinity College, Melbourne, and Steeton Trio.
 The 2012 Sydney season featured Goldner String Quartet, Piers Lane, and James Crabb.
 The 2012 Melbourne season featured Benjamin Breen & Caroline Almonte, Tiffany Speight & David McNicol, Oliver She, La Compañia, and Adam Chalabi & Marshall McGuire.
 The 2011 Sydney season featured Synergy Percussion, Geoffrey Collins with Alice Giles, Australian Brass Quintet, Emma-Jane Murphy with Bernadette Harvey.
 The 2011 Melbourne season featured Howard Panny with Timothy Young, Tinalley String Quartet, Saguaro Trio, Melbourne Symphony Percussion & Friends and Australian Brass Quintet.

Melbourne International Chamber Music Competition
In 2016, Musica Viva took over management of the Melbourne International Chamber Music Festival. The 8th edition was held in July 2018 at Australian National Academy of Music and Melbourne Recital Centre. The Grand Prize was won by piano trio Trio Marvin.

Rising Stars
In 2012, Musica Viva ran a program called Rising Stars – an initiative that provides purposeful performance-based and practical training opportunities for three emerging Australian chamber ensembles each year. The Rising Stars of 2012 were the Enigma Quartet, Sydney Camerata Quartet and Streeton Trio.  Genevieve Lacey is currently Artistic Director of Musica Viva's FutureMakers program

Country Wide
Country Wide is a regional touring program of public concerts, family concerts, workshops and residencies reaching more than 18,000 regional Australians each year.

Exports
Musica Viva Export was a program run in collaboration with the Department of Foreign Affairs and Trade, and arranged tours for Australian ensembles to South East Asia, India and China.

Beethoven and the Zipper
In 2011, the Academy Award-winning former film producer Suzanne Baker published a book titled Beethoven and the Zipper: The Astonishing Story of Musica Viva, which detailed how Richard Goldner had invented and patented a zip fastener for the Australian Army, and used the proceeds to establish Musica Viva Australia.

References

External links
 Official Musica Viva Website

APRA Award winners
Music promoters
Chamber music
Chamber music groups
Musical groups established in 1945